Parry Street is a street in Fremantle, Western Australia.

Its northernmost point is its junction with Elder Place and Beach Street.

Near the corner of Parry Street and Quarry Street is the Fremantle Substation, which was built in 1932 as a power station for the Fremantle Municipal Tramway network. It was taken over by the State Energy Commission of Western Australia when the trams were decommissioned in 1952, and operated as an energy-themed museum from 1989 to 2009, before being sold into private ownership at the latter date. Private residential apartments are planned for the site, with the original building exterior being mostly retained.

The Fremantle Bowling club is located at the intersection with Ellen Street.

Parry Street intersects with High Street at Queens Square.

The Parry Street car park, south of the intersection with High Street is adjacent to the Fremantle Prison.

The Fremantle branch of Legacy Australia is based at Legacy House, 17 Parry Street.  The Fly by Night Club was formerly located in the street.

Notes

External links 
 

 
Streets in Fremantle